Thomas Auth (born September 9, 1968) is an American former rower. He competed at the 1996 Summer Olympics and the 2000 Summer Olympics.He won a gold medal at the 1999 Pan American Games.

A 1986 graduate of Columbia High School in Maplewood, New Jersey, he graduated from Columbia College of Columbia University in 1990 and Harvard Law School in 1994.

References

External links
 

1968 births
Living people
American male rowers
Columbia High School (New Jersey) alumni
Olympic rowers of the United States
Rowers at the 1996 Summer Olympics
Rowers at the 2000 Summer Olympics
People from Orange, New Jersey
Sportspeople from Essex County, New Jersey
Pan American Games medalists in rowing
Pan American Games gold medalists for the United States
Rowers at the 1999 Pan American Games
Columbia Lions rowers
Harvard Law School alumni
Medalists at the 1999 Pan American Games